John Channing Buckland (1844 – 4 April 1909) was a 19th-century Member of Parliament from Otago, New Zealand.

Buckland was born in Auckland in 1844, the son of William Buckland and Susan (née Channing). Alfred Buckland was his uncle. Frank Buckland and Bessie Buckland were younger siblings; his brother became a politician and his sister (who married the collector and bibliographer Thomas Hocken) a notable artist and translator. Buckland received his education at Dr. Kinder's Grammar School and at St John's College in Auckland. On 17 December 1867, John Buckland married Caroline Fairburn. She was a daughter of William Thomas Fairburn. Her sister Elizabeth Fairburn was a missionary, teacher and bible translator and she was married to the missionary William Colenso.

Buckland fought in the Invasion of the Waikato under Colonel Marmaduke Nixon. Afterwards, he went to England for some years and returned in 1867, when he settled in Ōtāhuhu near Auckland, one of the fencible settlements established during the 1840s. Some years later, he moved to Otago and first lived at Waikouaiti and then at Taieri. He sold his holdings in Taieri in 1899.

His brother Frank Buckland was a member for south Auckland electorates at the same time.

In 1902, Buckland moved from North Otago to Akaroa, where he bought the Mount Bossu estate sheep farm at Wainui. He served on the Akaroa Council Council for four years but did not stand for re-election in 1908 over failing health. He died on 4 April 1909 at his homestead, The Glen. He was survived by his wife and seven children, including Jessie Buckland. His grandson, Geoffrey Orbell, was born a few months before his death to his daughter Rachel Orbell.

References

1844 births
1909 deaths
Members of the New Zealand House of Representatives
New Zealand MPs for Dunedin electorates
Unsuccessful candidates in the 1887 New Zealand general election
Unsuccessful candidates in the 1890 New Zealand general election
19th-century New Zealand politicians
John
People from Akaroa
Fairburn–Newman family